Knesseth Israel may refer to:

Congregation Knesseth Israel (Toronto)
Congregation Knesseth Israel (Ellington, Connecticut)
Knesseth Israel Congregation (Birmingham, Alabama)
Yeshivas Knesses Yisrael (Slabodka)
Knesset Yisrael, a historical courtyard neighborhood in Jerusalem, Israel